A Krishi Vigyan Kendra (KVK) is an agricultural extension center in India. The centres are associated with a local agricultural university, and serve as links between the Indian Council of Agricultural Research and farmers to apply agricultural research in a practical, localized setting. All KVKs fall under the jurisdiction of one of the 11 Agricultural Technology Application Research Institutes (ATARIs) throughout India.

As of May 2021, there are approximately 725 KVKs throughout India.

History 
The current national government's program "Doubling Farmers' Income by 2022" calls for increases in agricultural productivity, development initiatives such as Pradhan Mantri Krishi Sinchai Yojana and Pradhan Mantri Fasal Bima Yojana as well as more focus on technological innovation. The government expects KVKs to aid in the dissemination of information and practices regarding these new government initiatives. As of October 2018, there is an online dashboard that provides updates on the activity of various KVKs.

Criteria 
A KVK can be formed under a variety of host institutions, including agricultural universities, state departments, ICAR institutes, other educational institutions, or NGOs. The 700 KVKs in operation per the ICAR website are split into: 458 under State Agricultural Universities, 18 under Central Agricultural Universities, 64 under ICAR institutes, 105 under NGOs, 39 under state departments or other public sector undertakings, and 16 under other miscellaneous educational institutions. A KVK must own about 20 hectare of land for the purpose of testing new agricultural technologies.

Notable centers 
Krishi Vigyan Kendra Kannur
 Krishi Vigyan Kendra, Jalgaon Jamod
 Krishi Vigyan Kendra, Nashik
 Krishi Vigyan Kendra, Indian Institute of Spices Research
 Krishi Vigyan Kendra, Indian Institute of Horticulture Research

See also 
 Van Vigyan Kendra
 Indian Agricultural Statistics Research Institute
 List of agricultural centres established by CCS HAU

References

External links
 ICAR-BIRDS Krishi Vigyan Kendra, Belagavi-1
 KVKs in India
 ICAR-CAZRI Krishi Vigyan Kendra, Pali-Marwar, Rajasthan

Rural community development
1974 establishments in India
Agriculture in India